Harry Clinton Browne (August 18, 1878 – November 15, 1954) was an American banjo player and actor. He appeared on stage and in silent films and recorded for Columbia Records in the 1910s and 1920s.

Biography
Browne was born in 1878 in North Adams, Massachusetts. Before his acting career, he served in the Second Massachusetts U.S. Volunteers during the Spanish–American War and had a brief career campaigning for the Democratic Party. William Jennings Bryan, then the Secretary of State, offered Browne a diplomatic position in February 1914 but the latter declined. Browne later worked for a stock company as an actor, casting him in plays such as Arizona and Rebecca of Sunnybrook Farm in the early 1900s.

A skilled banjo player, Browne performed in vaudeville for seven years before recording a series of songs for Columbia Records, starting in 1916. His first record, perhaps his most well-known, is a re-interpretation of the American folk song "Turkey in the Straw". Released in March 1916, Browne appropriated the standard as a coon song re-titled "Nigger Love a Watermelon, Ha! Ha! Ha!". It is commonly referred to as one of the most racist songs in American music. The song relied heavily on the watermelon stereotype, a belief popularized in the 19th century that African-Americans had an unusual appetite for watermelons. For the B-side, Browne chose to record the minstrel show favorite "Old Dan Tucker", marking the tune's first commercial appearance on a major label.

Between 1906 and 1925, Browne appeared in at least 14 Broadway shows, including Oh, Lady! Lady!!. His film debut is believed to have been in August 1914 with the release of The Eagle's Mate. During his acting career, Browne had roles in notable films such as The Unwelcome Mrs. Hatch, The Heart of Jennifer, and Closed Doors. Afterwards, he worked as an announcer and production director for CBS radio, a position he resigned from in 1931.

Browne died in 1954, aged 76.

Partial filmography
 The Eagle's Mate (1914)
 The Heart of Jennifer (1915)
 The Flower of No Man's Land (1916)
 The Big Sister (1916)
 Scandal (1917) as Pelham Franklin
 Know Your Men (1921)
 Closed Doors (1921)
 Moral Fibre (1921)

References

External links

Harry C. Browne Draft Card

1878 births
1954 deaths
American white supremacists
American banjoists
20th-century American male actors
American male stage actors
American male silent film actors
Musicians from Massachusetts
Male actors from Massachusetts
People from North Adams, Massachusetts
American military personnel of the Spanish–American War
Military personnel from Massachusetts